Lori Anne Melien (born May 11, 1972) is a former competition swimmer from Canada. Melien won a bronze medal in the women's 4x100-metre medley relay at the 1988 Summer Olympics in Seoul, South Korea, together with Andrea Nugent, Allison Higson and Jane Kerr.

In individual events, she finished 12th and 19th in the 100-metre and 200-metre backstroke.  Melien swam much of her amateur career for the Ajax Aquatic Club in Ajax, Ontario where she still holds a number of club records.

See also
 List of Olympic medalists in swimming (women)

References

External links
 
 
 
 

1972 births
Living people
Canadian female backstroke swimmers
Medalists at the 1988 Summer Olympics
Olympic bronze medalists for Canada
Olympic bronze medalists in swimming
Olympic swimmers of Canada
Swimmers from Calgary
Swimmers at the 1988 Summer Olympics
Swimmers at the 1990 Commonwealth Games
Commonwealth Games medallists in swimming
Commonwealth Games bronze medallists for Canada
Medallists at the 1990 Commonwealth Games